Men of Chance is a 1931 American pre-Code drama film directed by George Archainbaud, starring Ricardo Cortez, Mary Astor, and John Halliday.

Plot
A destitute Marthe Preston is in dire straits in Paris until gambler Richard Dorval comes to her aid. In gratitude, she agrees to a scheme of Dorval's to seduce and wed his rival, "Diamond Johnny" Silk, then help ruin Johnny's horse-racing business interests.
 
Marthe's inside information enables Dorval and an accomplice, bookie Joe Farley, to bribe Johnny's jockeys to deliberately lose races or to help them influence the odds. Johnny learns the truth and demands she leave. Martha has fallen in love with her husband, however, so she pretends to go along with a plot to poison Johnny's horse, double-crossing Dorval and rejoicing in Johnny's triumph.

Cast
 Ricardo Cortez as Johnny Silk 
 Mary Astor as Marthe Preston Silk 
 John Halliday as Richard Dorval 
 Ralph Ince as Joe Farley 
 Kitty Kelly as Gertie Robbins 
 James Donlan as Clark 
 George Davis as The Frenchman

Uncredited:
 Herman Bing as Fritz Tannenbaum 
 André Cheron as French Detective 
 Jean De Briac as Hotel Manager
 Tom Herbert as One of Johnny's Bookies 
 John Larkin as Black Horse Handler 
 Tom McGuire as Race Track Bookie 
 Frank Mills as Tony - One of Johnny's Bookies

References

External links
 
 
 
 

American black-and-white films
Films directed by George Archainbaud
Films about gambling
American horse racing films
American drama films
1931 drama films
1931 films
1930s American films
1930s English-language films